The Insider Exclusive television show regularly produces original Dateline, 60 Minutes, 20/20, and prime time style television shows for the public and broadcasts them on major cable networks such as PBS, CNN, MSNBC, TruTV, Fox, Time Warner and Comcast, Cox, Charter, A&E, Discovery, TLC, and Bravo.  The focus is primarily on "Important Business, Legal and Public Policy Issues". The Insider Exclusive also features important cases that represent injustice, unfairness and/or deception, either for individuals or groups seeking to vindicate their civil rights.

Created and hosted by Steve Murphy, the format is original programming based on exclusive and personal interviews, similar to PBS's Bill Moyers, CNN's Anderson Cooper, and PBS's Charlie Rose shows.  Each show features the lives of local and national newsmakers, entertainers, lawyers, entrepreneurs, celebrities, and best-selling authors.  The shows feature rare, behind-the-scenes, exclusive perspectives of headline stories.

Series Overview 
 Insider Exclusive Special Feature Series
 America's Finest Trial Lawyer Series
 America's Best TV Judges
 America's Best Civil Leaders
 America's Prominent Doctors Series
 America's Best TV Anchors & legal Commentators
 Headline Civil Rights News Series
 Headline Legal News Series 
 Headline Business News Series
 Helping America's Children Series
 The IRS & You: Solving Tax Related Collection problems
 The Energy & Environmental Advisor Series 
 Mass Torts & Pharmaceutical Drug Litigation News Series
 Los Angeles Most Influential Women Series
 Southern California's Premier Law Firms Series 
 Houston's Premier Law Firms Series
 Chicago's Premier Law Firms Series
 New York's Premier Law Firms Series

List of guests

Most highly rated shows 
 NY Times Bestseller: Murdered by Mumia: A Life Sentence of Loss, Pain, and Injustice. 
 Whistleblower Lawsuits at the Los Angeles DWP
 Civil Rights News: Police Brutality at the Hawthorne Police 
 Wrongfully Convicted - Life After Exoneration Program 
 Crisis in Los Osos, California 
 Police Misconduct at The LA Sheriff's Dept 
 Ray Boucher & The Consumer Attorneys of California:
 Randy H. McMurray, Esq. of McMurray Henriks, LLP & Consumer Attorneys Association of Los Angeles ("CAALA")
 Tom Girardi & Howard Miller & Girardi & Keese of Girard & Keese 
 Paul Kiesel: Changes Needed in the Medical Injury Compensation Reform Act (MICRA)

External links
 insiderexclusive.com, Official Web Site
 lbishow.com, Affiliate Site
 prlawinc.typepad.com, Affiliate Site

American television talk shows